William Jamieson may refer to:
 William Darius Jamieson (1873–1949), newspaper publisher and U.S. Representative from Iowa
 William Allan Jamieson (1839–1916), Scottish physician and academic author
 William Jamieson (mining) (1852–1926), Australian surveyor
 William Jamieson (Australian politician) (1861–1912), member of the South Australian House of Assembly
 Billy Jamieson (1954–2011), Canadian treasure and antique dealer and reality TV star
 Willie Jamieson (born 1963), football player
 Willie Jamieson (curler), Scottish curler